Reigning Queens is a 1985 series of silkscreen portraits by American artist Andy Warhol. The screen prints were presented as a portfolio of sixteen; four prints each of the four queens regnant. The subjects were Queen Elizabeth II of the United Kingdom and the other Commonwealth realms, Queen Beatrix of the Netherlands, Queen Ntfombi Twala of Swaziland and Queen Margrethe II of Denmark.

Description 
Reigning Queens only includes ruling queens. The series portrays four queens at that time: Queen Elizabeth II of the United Kingdom and the other Commonwealth realms, Queen Beatrix of Netherlands, Queen Margrethe II of Denmark, and Queen Ntfombi Twala of Swaziland. The images used by Warhol that to make the screen prints were derived from official photographs. The images were then overlaid with Warhol's trademark abstract blocks of color. 

A separate 'Royal edition' was issued of the portfolio; with the portraits featuring diamond dust or 'ground up glass' applied to the portrait when wet. Tate Galleries described the dust as having "a sparkly, extravagant effect". Thirty sets of the Royal edition were produced.Time wrote that Warhol's portraits of Queen Elizabeth II "treat her like any other celebrity, frozen in time and bright colours".

The portrait of Queen Elizabeth II was based on the official photograph released for her Silver Jubilee in 1977, taken by Peter Grugeon at Windsor Castle on April 2, 1975. The British Royal Collection wrote in a description that "Warhol has simplified Grugeon's portrait so that all that remains is a mask-like face. All character has been removed and we are confronted by a symbol of royal power".

Four prints from the Royal edition of Queen Elizabeth II from the Reigning Queens series were acquired by the Royal Collection of the British royal family in 2012. These prints are the only ones in the Royal Collection that Queen Elizabeth did not sit for or commission.

Critical reception 

Reigning Queens was shown at the Leo Castelli Gallery in New York City from September 1985 to October 1985. Warhol was upset about the exhibition. He wrote in the Andy Warhol Diaries, "I just hate George Mulder for showing here in America. They were supposed to be only for Europe—nobody here cares about royalty and it'll be another bad review."

According to art critic Wayne Koestenbaum, the show represented, in Warhol's eyes, his "rock bottom."

Alfredo Jaar felt the series was a "monument to kitsch" in a 2012 interview for the book Regarding Warhol: Sixty Artists, Fifty Years. Anthony Haden-Guest wrote that the series "had been correctly seen as a shameless assault on the rich kitsch market" in his 1998 book True Colors: The Real Life of the Art World.

References

1985 paintings
Paintings by Andy Warhol
Cultural depictions of Elizabeth II
Portraits by American artists
Portraits of the British Royal Family
Portraits of women
20th-century portraits